This is an inclusive list of science fiction television programs whose names begin with the letter R.

R
Live-action
Raised by Wolves (2020–present)
Rapt (2015, Ireland, mini-series) 
Raumpatrouille – Die phantastischen Abenteuer des Raumschiffes Orion (1966, Germany)  Space Patrol – The Fantastic Adventures of the Spaceship Orion (US)
Ray Bradbury Theatre (1985–1992, anthology)
Read All About It! (1979–1983, Canada, educational)
Real Humans (2012–2013, Sweden)
Red Dwarf (1988–1999, 2009–present, UK)
Red Faction: Origins (2011, pilot, film)
Redman (1972, Japan)
ReGenesis (2004–2008, Canada)
Rentaghost (1976)
Rescapés, Les a.k.a. Survivors, The (2010, Canada)
Resident Alien (2021–present)
Return to Jupiter (1997, Australia)
Return to the Lost Planet (1955, UK) IMDb
Revolution (2012–2014)
Riverworld (franchise):
Riverworld (2003, film)
Riverworld (2010, film)
Robin de Robot (1975, Belgium) IMDb
RoboCop (franchise):
RoboCop: The Series (1994, Canada)
RoboCop: Prime Directives (2001, Canada, miniseries)
Rocketship 7 (1962–1978, 1992–1993)
Rocky Jones, Space Ranger (1954)
Rod Brown of the Rocket Rangers (1953–1954)
Roswell (1994, film)
Roswell (franchise):
Roswell (1999–2002)
Roswell, New Mexico (2019–2022)

Animation
R.O.D -THE TV- (2003–2004, Japan, animated)
RahXephon (2002, Japan, animated)
Ray the Animation (2006, Japan, animated)
ReBoot (1994–2001, Canada, animated)
Red Planet (1994, miniseries, animated)
Red vs. Blue (2003, machinima, animated)
Redakai: Conquer the Kairu a.k.a. Redakai (2011–2013, animated)
Rick and Morty (2013–present, animated)
Ripping Friends, The (2001–2002, US/Canada, animated)
Road Rovers (1996–1997, animated)
RoboCop (franchise):
RoboCop: The Animated Series (1988, animated)
RoboCop: Alpha Commando (1998–1999, animated)
Roboroach (2002–2003, Canada, animated)
Robotboy (2005–2008, UK/France/US, animated)
Robotech (adaptation) (franchise):
Codename: Robotech (1985, US, animated, pilot)
Robotech (1985, 3 anime television series adaptation, US/Japan, animated)
Robotech II: The Sentinels (1986, US, Robotech sequel, pilot, animated)
Robot Chicken (2005–present, stop-motion animation) (elements of science fiction in this and this episode)
Robotix (1985, animated)
Robotomy (2010, animated)
Rocket Robin Hood (1966–1969, Canada, animated)
Rod Rocket (1963, animated)
RollBots (2009–2010, Canada/US, animated)
Roswell Conspiracies: Aliens, Myths and Legends (1999–2000, animated)
Roughnecks: Starship Troopers Chronicles (1999–2000, animated)
Rainbow Rangers (2018-, animated)

References

Television programs, R